Fort Santo Domingo is a historical fortress in Tamsui District, New Taipei City, Taiwan. It was originally a wooden fort built in 1628 by the Spanish Empire, who named it "Fort Santo Domingo". However, the fort was then destroyed by the Spanish themselves, after losing the Second Battle of San Salvador to the Dutch Empire in 1642. After the battle, in 1644, the Dutch rebuilt a fort in the original site and renamed it "Fort Antonio". Since the Dutch were called "Red-haired People" by the Han immigrants during the time, the fort was then nicknamed "Fort Red Hair".().

In 1724, the Qing Government repaired the fort, and built a perimeter wall with four gates. From 1868 onwards the fort was leased to the British government as its consulate, and a new two-storey building was built nearby as the consul's residence. The fort continued to be used as a British consulate during Japanese rule, but was briefly closed during the Pacific War.

After the war, it was returned to British control. The site was used as an unofficial British embassy until 1972, though official diplomatic relations between Republic of China (Taiwan) and the United Kingdom were terminated in 1950. Afterwards the fort was temporarily managed by Australia and the United States of America, before the fort was returned to the government of Republic of China (Taiwan) in 1980. Since then, the fort has been a National Historical Site, open to tourists and archaeologists alike.

The site of Fort San Domingo includes the main fortress, the former British consul's residence, and the south gate built during Qing dynasty. Among the architectures, the main fortress is one of the oldest buildings on the whole island, and there were four cannons placed in the front of the fortress, which could be traced back to Jiaqing era. The former British consul's residence is on the east side of the main fortress, and is a two-storey English-style building. The south gate is the only Chinese style architecture among all the buildings, and is made from Guangin Stones.

Fort San Domingo is located near Hobe Fort, which was built during the late Qing era.

History

Spanish Era

After the Spanish established a permanent colony at San Salvador (Palm Island; modern-day Hoping Island), they proceeded in 1629 to occupy Tamsui, "which even at this early period was frequented by many Chinese merchants, who came from Fokien to barter with the Formosa natives." On a night in 1636, a group of local people, angered by the taxes that the Spanish governor had imposed, successfully attacked the fort and demolished it. In 1637, the Spanish rebuilt the fort using stone and raised the walls' height to twenty feet or more. A church was also built on a hill, and the locals helped to make a road to it from the fort. "Peter Nuits the Dutch Governor of Formosa, reported these facts to his home authorities and exposed in an interesting report the injury that the Spaniards were doing to Dutch trade and the necessity of sending an expedition to drive them away."

After a failed first attempt in 1641, the Dutch made a second expedition on 3 August 1642: "the Dutch appeared off Tamsui with a comparatively powerful squadron of four frigates, a large cutter, nine small vessels, besides several transports..." After the Dutch mounted artillery at an elevation commanding the fort, they succeeded in taking the fort on 24 August. The Dutch also expelled the Spaniards from nearby Keelung. The Spanish fort in Tamsui had by then already been razed by the Spanish themselves. It is also claimed that no traces remain of the forts on Palm Island, as they were destroyed by Zheng Jing, son of Koxinga.

Dutch era

The Dutch then became the "undisputed masters of Formosa", and built a new fort on the site with the intention to maintain the trade of sulfur and deer skin, while also deploying vessels in the Tamsui River to protect the trading zone. The fort was named as Fort Antonio, with the name of Governors-General of the Dutch East Indies, Anthony van Diemen, during the time.

In 1644, they replaced it with the structure still standing today, also called Fort Antonio. The "Old Dutch Fort" made of brick and stone has been described as "impregnable against any engines of war that those early days could produce."

The locals called the Dutch "the red-haired people", which led to the compound's Hokkien name.

Qing era
From 1683 to 1867 the Qing Dynasty Chinese government controlled the fort and during this time (1724) built a stone wall with four gates around it, of which only one, the main gate, survives.

 
Following the Second Opium War, in 1868 the British took over the fort, made it their trade consulate, and painted it red (it was previously white). The fort was struck during the 1884 French bombardment of the Battle of Tamsui but suffered no damage. The linguist Herbert Allen Giles resided in the fort from 1885 to 1888 and completed some of his work on the Wade-Giles system of romanization of Standard Chinese there. Next to the fort the British built their consular residence in 1891.

The Fort is adjacent to Aletheia University, which traces its origins back to 1872 when the Reverend Dr. George Leslie Mackay, a Canadian Presbyterian, established a mission and then a medical service and a school.

Modern era
The consulate closed during World War II and reopened after the end of the war. The premises remained as the British consulate in Taiwan until 1972, when the United Kingdom recognized the People's Republic of China. It then served as the Austrian embassy in Taiwan for a few months, until that nation also recognized the PRC. Aletheia University then attempted to acquire the fort, but no deal was reached by the time negotiations ended in 1978. The government of the Republic of China terminated the lease in 1980, taking ownership of the fort by 30 June. It was opened to tourists on 25 December 1984.

The fort is classified as a grade one listed historical site and is now a museum with the interior recreated from photographs. In 2003, maintenance of the site was entrusted to the Taipei County Government from the Ministry of the Interior. It was reopened after refurbishment in 2005.

Tourist information
The fort and the former British consular residence, an elegant Victorian house fused with some Chinese elements, now function as a museum. The location provides a beautiful outlook on the Tamsui River and Guanyin Mountain. 

The fort is open to the public Tuesday – Sunday, 9am – 5pm. There is an $80NTD charge for admission, with some exceptions.

Transport
The fort is accessible within walking distance North West from Tamsui Station of the Taipei Metro.

See also
 Fort Provintia
 Fort Zeelandia (Taiwan)
 Cape Santiago (Taiwan)
 Eternal Golden Castle
 Taiwan under Dutch rule
 History of Taiwan

References

Bibliography

External links

 Tamsui Historical Museum, New Taipei City

1629 establishments in Taiwan
1629 establishments in the Spanish East Indies
San Domingo
Spanish Formosa
Dutch Formosa
Spanish East Indies
Military and war museums in Taiwan
Buildings and structures completed in 1644
Tourist attractions in New Taipei
Spanish Colonial architecture
Former properties of the Dutch East India Company
Buildings and structures associated with the Dutch East India Company
National monuments of Taiwan